Bill Hogarth Secondary School is a public high school in Markham, Ontario, Canada operated by the York Region District School Board. It opened in November 2017 for students in grades 9 and 10, some of whom were transferred from Pierre Elliott Trudeau High School. It offers a French immersion track in addition to the English curriculum. It is located at the intersection of Bur Oak Avenue and Almira Avenue.

The school is named after Bill Hogarth, a former teacher and director of the York Region District School Board.

Construction of the school was delayed by rain from April to July 2017, necessitating the school's opening being delayed from September to November 2017. During those months, students attended the nearby Bur Oak Secondary School.

Feeder schools
The following elementary schools are part of the Bill Hogarth S.S feeder schools (transferred from Bur Oak SS and Pierre Elliott Trudeau HS):
 Black Walnut Public School
 Rouge Park Public School
 Cornell Village Public School
 Little Rouge Public School
 Sam Chapman Public School (FI)
 Franklin Street Public School (FI)
 Glad Park Public School (FI)

Notes

References

External links
 
 YRDSB school profile
 

York Region District School Board
High schools in the Regional Municipality of York
Buildings and structures in Markham, Ontario
Pierre Trudeau
Educational institutions established in 2017
2017 establishments in Ontario